Luigi Antonio Sabbatini (1732, Albano Laziale, Italy – January 29, 1809, Padova, Italy) was an Italian composer and music theorist. He studied music at Bologna in the Franciscan Monastery, under Father Giovanni Battista Martini. He published a textbook on the theoretical elements of music, in 1789, in three volumes, a treatise on fugues, in 1802. He also contributed to the use of numerical signatures of musical harmony. In May 1807, he was elected to the Accademia Italiana.

Bibliography
 Sabbatini, LA. Trattato Sopra le Fughe Musicali. Venezia, 1802.
 Sabbatini, LA. Elementi Teorici della Musica. Roma, 1789–1790.
 Sabbatini, LA. La Vera Idea degli Musicali Numeriche Signature, Diretta al Giovane Studioso dell'Armonia. Venezia, 1799.

Notes

1732 births
1809 deaths
People from Albano Laziale
Italian composers
Italian male composers
Italian music theorists
Pupils of Giovanni Battista Martini